Épouse-moi mon pote (meaning "Marry me, my dude" in French) is a 2017 French comedy film. It is the first feature film directed by Tarek Boudali. He also plays the lead role in the film. The film was launched on 25 October 2017 on French screens.

Synopsis
The film tells the story of Yassine, a straight Moroccan guy (played by the director of the film Tarek Boudali) who, by a stroke of bad luck, becomes an illegal immigrant in France. He solves the problem by tying the knot with his best buddy, Fred (played by Philippe Lacheau), except that an immigration officer Dussart (played by Philippe Duquesne) seems to have sniffed out their fake marriage union.

Cast 
 Tarek Boudali as Yassine
 Philippe Lacheau as Fred
 Charlotte Gabris as Lisa
 Andy Raconte as Claire
 David Marsais as Stan
 Baya Belal as Ima
 Philippe Duquesne as Dussart
 Doudou Masta as Daoud
 Nadia Kounda as Sana
 Julien Arruti as The blind
 Zinedine Soualem as Yassine's father
 Yves Pignot as The mayor
 Ramzy Bedia as A qatari

Reception

Épouse-moi mon pote grossed $21.5 million at the box office.

References

External links 
 

2017 films
2010s French-language films
French comedy films
2017 comedy films
2010s French films